Young Russia is a Russian youth movement founded in April 2005. The movement is known for its protest rallies in front of foreign embassies and for various political rallies in the streets.

The organization was founded in April 2005 by a group of students and post-graduate students of the Bauman Moscow State Technical University. The manifesto of the movement stipulates that their main activity will be directed against "Western expansion, terrorism and corruption".

In March 2009 leader of the movement Maksim Mishenko declared that the movement would rather focus in other directions: among others - the fight against the religious sect of scientologists and against illegal sales of alcohol to minors. According to Mishenko, after presidential elections the main enemy diminished its influence, and the United States of America will no longer try to use "Orange revolution technologies" to interfere in the internal affairs of our country. We need to prepare for a peaceful life and refocus our resources.

References

External links
 Young Russia's official web site

Politics of Russia
Youth organizations based in Russia
Russian political activists